Robert Newton (born 23 November 1956) is an English footballer. Newton played as a striker for several clubs in the lower divisions of the English Football League during the 1970s and 1980s. He is most notable for his first five-year spell at Hartlepool United between 1977 and 1982, where he wrote himself into club history with his 48 goals in 150 league games. Popular with Hartlepool supporters, he was later voted as the club's 'Player of the 1980s'.

Career

Huddersfield Town
Newton began his career at Huddersfield Town with the "Terriers" in 1973–74. Newton was named most valuable player in a world youth competition at 17, but suffered two severe injuries that took him off the field for more than two years. He spent four years at Huddersfield and left to join Hartlepool United in mid-1977.

Hartlepool United
He scored eight goals for Hartlepool in his debut season, including both goals in the club's shock 2–1 victory against Crystal Palace in the third round of the FA Cup.

Off the field, Newton has had two car accidents, including one in 1978 in which his passenger, teammate Dave Wiggett, was fatally injured; he was sentenced to nine months in prison in 1979 after being found Guilty of causing death by reckless driving. After the incident he moved to the United States, playing for the New England/Jacksonville Tea Men in the North American Soccer League in 1980 and 1981.

Newton returned to English football and was well received by fans at the Victoria Ground, and for three years formed a strike partnership with teammate Keith Houchen. In 1981–82, Newton and Houchen each had 18 goals and were Hartlepool's top scorers with Newton scoring a total of sixty goals with Hartlepool.

Port Vale
In September 1982, Newton was transferred to Port Vale, where he went on to become the team's top scorer with 22 goals, while the club achieved promotion to Division Three. "Valiants" manager John McGrath nicknamed Newton and strike partner Ernie Moss as the "Kray twins" due to their dominance of opposition defenders.

Chesterfield
The following season, he joined his hometown club Chesterfield, with Martin Henderson and £8,000 going to Port Vale. Newton scored two goals on his debut on 15 October, in a 4–2 win over Rochdale. He spent two seasons at Saltergate and topped the Spireites' goalscoring chart in both seasons, forming a powerful front three with Phil Brown and Ernie Moss. After leaving Chesterfield Newton returned to Hartlepool in the summer of 1985 on the promise of better wages.

Later career
After his return to Hartlepool, Newton scored two goals in 11 matches before being loaned to Stockport County and subsequently released. He finished his Football League career with the Bristol Rovers in 1987, before joining Shepsed Charterhouse. He then played for the Cyprus-based AEP Paphos and Hong Kong's Laisun team before returning to England and joining the Chesterfield based KSPO team.

He later played for several non-league clubs, including Goole Town, Boston United and Alfreton Town.

Style of play
Newton was a strong and determined forward.

Post-retirement
Since retiring, Newton has been involved in various charity causes. He also worked as a lorry driver before he was caught drink driving and handed a 12-month driving ban in December 2007. His son, Lee, was a trainee at Chesterfield.

Career statistics
Source:

Honours
Port Vale
Football League Fourth Division third-place promotion: 1982–83

Chesterfield
Football League Fourth Division: 1984–85

References

1956 births
Living people
Footballers from Chesterfield
English footballers
Association football forwards
Huddersfield Town A.F.C. players
Hartlepool United F.C. players
Expatriate soccer players in the United States
New England Tea Men players
Jacksonville Tea Men players
Port Vale F.C. players
Chesterfield F.C. players
Stockport County F.C. players
Bristol Rovers F.C. players
English expatriate footballers
Expatriate footballers in Cyprus
Expatriate footballers in Hong Kong
Goole Town F.C. players
Alfreton Town F.C. players
Boston United F.C. players
English Football League players
North American Soccer League (1968–1984) players
Northern Premier League players
National League (English football) players
English expatriate sportspeople in the United States
Sportspeople convicted of crimes